Moslem Uddin is a Bangladesh Awami League politician and the incumbent Member of Parliament from Fulbaria, Mymensingh.

Early life 
Uddin was born on 30 January 1939. He has  B.A., B.Ed, and LLB degrees.

Career 
Uddin was elected to Parliament in 1986, 1996, 2008, and 2014 from Mymensingh-6 as a Bangladesh Awami League candidate. On 31 December 2016, a murder case was filed against him over the death of two protesters, including a professor, in police action. The protestors were demanding the nationalization of the Fulbaria Degree College. On 24 January 2017, a former member of Mukti Bahini filed a case against Udin accusing him of carrying out war crimes during the Bangladesh Liberation war.

See also
 Shahabuddin Degree College
 Begum Fazilatunnecha Mujib Government Mohila College

References

Awami League politicians
Living people
3rd Jatiya Sangsad members
6th Jatiya Sangsad members
9th Jatiya Sangsad members
10th Jatiya Sangsad members
1939 births
11th Jatiya Sangsad members